Gurdwara Sri Guru Singh Sabha is a Sikh gurdwara, or Sikh house of worship, in Delhi, India. It also known as the Gurdwara Pahari Wala or Pahariwala.

It is situated in Greater Kailash 1. Another Gurdwara Sri Guru Singh Sabha (Greater Kailash 2) with the same name exists in Greater Kailash 2.

History 
It was founded in the early 1960s by the local community on public land. The Mata Gujri school and dispensary was added later.

References

External links  
 Facebook page
 https://www.justdial.com/photos/gurudwara-sri-guru-singh-sabha-greater-kailash-1-delhi-gurudwaras-16imk3b-pc-61942832-sco-23rkig8h

Gurdwaras in Delhi
20th-century gurdwaras
Singh Sabha movement